The 2004 Missouri Democratic presidential primary on February 3, 2004 determined the recipient of the state's 88 delegates to the Democratic National Convention in the process to elect the 44th President of the United States. It was an open primary.

Endorsements
Several major endorsements, such as the St. Louis Post-Dispatch, helped John Kerry to clinch the primary. John Edwards got former speaker of the house Jim Kreider and Buchanan County Auditor Susan Montee as endorsements. Governor Howard Dean got the endorsement of Chairman and CEO of King Hershey Richard A. King.

Polling

Source: Missouri - 2004 Presidential Polls

Results
John Kerry won a majority of the Missouri vote. He won every congressional district and county except Knox County and Lawrence County which Edwards won. Howard Dean received 9%, Clark got 4%, and several other candidates split the remainder.

See also
 2004 Missouri Republican presidential primary

References

Democratic primary
2004
Missouri